The 1960 United States Senate special election in Missouri took place on November 8, 1960 in Missouri. The incumbent Democratic Senator, Thomas C. Hennings Jr., had died on September 13, 1960. Edward V. Long, the incumbent Lieutenant Governor of Missouri, was appointed to the seat on September 23, 1960, and won the special election. He defeated Republican nominee Lon Hocker, winning 53.2% of the vote. Long outperformed Democratic presidential nominee John F. Kennedy, who won 50.3% in Missouri in the presidential election.

Democratic convention
Following the death of Hennings, the Missouri Democratic Party held a special convention to nominate a successor and candidate for the special election. The convention was deadlocked between Charles Harrison Brown, Representative for Missouri's 7th district, and James T. Blair Jr, the Governor of Missouri. Long emerged as a compromise candidate, and was endorsed by the convention on September 21.

Results

References

1960
Missouri
United States Senate
Missouri 1960
Missouri 1960
United States Senate 1960